The 2018 Estonian Football Winter Tournament or the 2018 EJL Jalgpallihalli Turniir is the fifth edition of the annual tournament in Estonia.  This tournament is divided into five groups of 6 teams.

Group A

Group B

Group C

Group D

Group E

References
Home page

Winter
Estonian Football Winter Tournament